Claudia Inés Serrano Madrid (born 17 February 1957) is a Chilean politician and sociologist who served as minister during the first government of Michelle Bachelet (2006–2010).

References

External Links
 Profile at RedEncuentros

1957 births
Living people
Chilean people
Pontifical Catholic University of Chile alumni
University of Chile alumni
School for Advanced Studies in the Social Sciences alumni
Chilean sociologists
Chilean women sociologists
21st-century Chilean politicians
Socialist Party of Chile politicians